Virtuous Pedophiles is an  Internet-based mutual support group for pedophiles who acknowledge having a sexual interest in children and do not act on their attraction. Members support each other in trying to lead normal lives without committing child sexual abuse. Members share the belief that sexual activity between adults and children is wrong and always will be. They also work against the stigma attached to pedophiles. The two founders of the group use the pseudonyms Ethan Edwards and Nick Devin. They do not reveal their true identity because they fear ostracism and hatred. There are over 2,000 users registered, including former offenders, parents of children, parents of pedophiles, and a few sex researchers.

Stance
Virtuous Pedophiles is a forum which takes a firm stand against child sexual exploitation of any kind, including viewing child pornography. There are a number of pedophile organizations in the world, but most of them are either unclear about their attitude towards sexual contact with children or actively campaign to lower age-of-consent laws and to legalize sexual acts with children or child pornography. Virtuous Pedophiles instead accepts these laws and aims to help pedophiles "lead happy, productive and law-abiding lives".

Recognition
The group's efforts have been supported for their potential benefits by several human sexuality experts, such as Jesse Bering and James Cantor. Cantor believes such groups can help prevent child sexual abuse. "It is hard to imagine someone who would feel more isolated than someone who recognizes he is sexually interested in children. In my experience, it is in those phases of greatest desperation that a pedophile is most likely to do something desperate, risking harm to a child," Cantor said. "Mutual support among people who share the same daily battle with their own desires can go a long way in addressing the extreme isolation, serving as a potential pressure valve, adding layer of protection, helping pedophiles to keep their behaviors under control."

The group was acknowledged in a New York Times editorial about the distinction between pedophilia and child sexual abuse by law professor Margo Kaplan. Kaplan wrote, "It is not that these individuals are 'inactive' or 'nonpracticing' pedophiles, but rather that pedophilia is a status and not an act." In November 2014, a well publicized Channel 4 programme on pedophilia included an interview with someone who admitted to having pedophilic urges but had not acted upon them.

In 2017, Alexander McBride of Vice News wrote: "many of these claims [of not offending] cannot be verified. Perhaps some are using VirPed as a cover-up; perhaps some, who were even more daring, saw my photo story as a way to prove they had nothing to hide. I cannot guarantee that this is not the case and I can understand why many would be suspicious."

References

External links 
 

Crime prevention
Pedophilia
Online support groups